Baz Howz may refer to:
 Baz Howz-e Olya
 Baz Howz-e Sofla